The 1980 NCAA Men's Water Polo Championship was the 12th annual NCAA Men's Water Polo Championship to determine the national champion of NCAA men's college water polo. Tournament matches were played at the Belmont Plaza Pool in Long Beach, California during December 1980.

Stanford defeated California in the final, 8–6, to win their third national title.

John Gansel (Stanford) and Kevin Robertson (California) were named the Co-Most Outstanding Players of the tournament. An All-Tournament Team, consisting of nine players, was also named. 

Robertson and Scott Schulte (Bucknell) were the tournament's leading scorers (12 goals). Schulte is the only men's water polo player to be the leading scorer in four consecutive tournaments (1977–1980).

Qualification
Since there has only ever been one single national championship for water polo, all NCAA men's water polo programs (whether from Division I, Division II, or Division III) were eligible. A total of 8 teams were invited to contest this championship.

Bracket
Site: Belmont Plaza Pool, Long Beach, California

{{8TeamBracket-Consols
| team-width=150
| RD3=First round
| RD4=Championship semifinals
| RD2=Consolation semifinals
| RD5=Championship
| RD5b=Third place
| RD1=Fifth place
| RD1b=Seventh place

| RD3-seed1= | RD3-team1=Stanford | RD3-score1=22
| RD3-seed2= | RD3-team2=Loyola–Chicago | RD3-score2=5
| RD3-seed3= | RD3-team3=Pepperdine | RD3-score3=9
| RD3-seed4= | RD3-team4=USC | RD3-score4=8
| RD3-seed5= | RD3-team5=UC Irvine | RD3-score5=13| RD3-seed6= | RD3-team6=Bucknell | RD3-score6=4
| RD3-seed7= | RD3-team7=California | RD3-score7=11| RD3-seed8= | RD3-team8= UC Santa Barbara | RD3-score8=7

| RD4-seed1= | RD4-team1=Stanford | RD4-score1=17| RD4-seed2= | RD4-team2=Pepperdine | RD4-score2=6
| RD4-seed3= | RD4-team3=UC Irvine | RD4-score3=7
| RD4-seed4= | RD4-team4=California | RD4-score4=9| RD2-seed1= | RD2-team1=Loyola–Chicago | RD2-score1=3
| RD2-seed2= | RD2-team2=USC | RD2-score2=16| RD2-seed3= | RD2-team3=Bucknell | RD2-score3=8
| RD2-seed4= | RD2-team4=UC Santa Barbara | RD2-score4=10

| RD5-seed1= | RD5-team1=Stanford | RD5-score1=8
| RD5-seed2= | RD5-team2=California | RD5-score2=6

| RD5b-seed1= | RD5b-team1=Pepperdine | RD5b-score1=8
| RD5b-seed2= | RD5b-team2=UC Irvine | RD5b-score2=10| RD1-seed1= | RD1-team1=USC | RD1-score1=11| RD1-seed2= | RD1-team2=UC Santa Barbara | RD1-score2=4

| RD1b-seed1= | RD1b-team1=Loyola–Chicago | RD1b-score1=4
| RD1b-seed2= | RD1b-team2=Bucknell | RD1b-score2=8}}

 All-tournament team John Gansel, Stanford (Co-Most outstanding player)Kevin Robertson, California''' (Co-Most outstanding player)
James Bergeson, Stanford
Jody Campbell, Stanford
Peter Campbell, UC Irvine
Bob Diepersloot, California
Chris Kelsey, Stanford
Alan Mouchawar, Stanford
Terry Schroeder, Pepperdine

See also 
 NCAA Men's Water Polo Championship

References

NCAA Men's Water Polo Championship
NCAA Men's Water Polo Championship
1980 in sports in California
December 1980 sports events in the United States
1980